Job fraud is fraudulent or deceptive activity or representation on the part of an employee or prospective employee toward an employer. It is not to be confused with employment fraud, where an employer scams job seekers or fails to pay wages for work performed. There are several types of job frauds that employees or potential employees commit against employers. While some may be illegal under jurisdictional laws, others do not violate law but may be held by the employer against the employee or applicant.

Résumé fraud
Résumé fraud or application fraud is any act that involves intentionally providing fictitious, exaggerated, or otherwise misleading information on a job application or résumé in hopes of persuading a potential employer to hire an applicant for a job for which they may be unqualified or less qualified than other applicants.

Effects
39% of UK organizations have experienced a situation where their vetting procedures have allowed an employee to be hired who was later found to have lied or misrepresented themselves in their application.

Demographics
Younger, more junior people are more likely to have a discrepancy on their CV. Someone in a junior administrative position is 23% more likely to have a discrepancy on their CV than in a managerial role. An applicant aged under 20 is 26% more likely to have a discrepancy than a 51- to 60-year-old.

Neither men nor women are statistically more likely to have a discrepancy on their CV (X-squared = 0.56, df = 1, p-value = 0.46): 24% of applications submitted by women have a discrepancy compared to 26% of those for men.

A 2008 study found a discrepancy in the CVs of 14% of those that had graduated from top 20 universities compared to 43% of those that had graduated from a low ranked university. Maths graduates had the lowest proportion of discrepancies, 6%.

References

Further reading
 

fraud
grounds for termination of employment
recruitment